The following is the list of the Marseille Metro stations in Marseille, France.  there are 29 stations in the Marseille Metro system, for a total of  of route.

List

Line 1 

It was inaugurated in 1977, becoming the first French metro line to enter in service outside Paris after Lyon (1974). It was later extended in 1978, 1992 and 2010.

 La Fourragère 
 Saint-Barnabé
 Louis Armand 
 La Blancarde (transfer: Tram T1, Tram T2, SNCF station)
 La Timone
 Baille
 Castellane (transfer: Tram T3, Metro M2)
 Estrangin - Préfecture
 Vieux-Port - Hôtel de Ville
 Colbert - Hôtel de Région
 Saint-Charles (transfer: Metro M2, SNCF main station)
 Réformés - Canebière (transfer: Tram T2)
 Cinq-Avenues - Longchamp (transfer: Tram T2)
 Chartreux
 Saint-Just - Hôtel de Département
 Malpassé
 Frais Vallon
 La Rose

Line 2 

Am extension of the Line 2 north of Bougainville, to a new terminus station at Gèze, opened in December 2019.

 Gèze
 Bougainville
 National
 Désirée Clary
 Joliette (transfer: Tram T2, Tram T3)
 Jules Guesde
 Saint-Charles (transfer: Metro M1, SNCF main station)
 Noailles (transfer: Tram T1, Tram T2)
 Notre-Dame-du-Mont - Cours Julien
 Castellane (transfer: Tram T3, Metro M1)
 Périer
 Rond-Point du Prado
 Sainte-Marguerite Dromel

See also 
 Marseille Metro
 Marseille tramway
 List of metro systems

References

External links 
 Official web site of the RTM , " régie des transports de Marseille "

Marseille
Railway stations in Marseille
Metro stations
Marseille
Metro